Skyhaven Airport  is a public use airport located in Eaton Township, Wyoming County, Pennsylvania, United States. The airport is one nautical mile (1.85 km) south of the central business district of the borough of Tunkhannock.

Facilities and aircraft 
It has one runway designated 1/19 with an asphalt surface measuring 2,007 by 50 feet (612 x 15 m).

For the 12-month period ending June 16, 2009, the airport had 21,690 aircraft operations, an average of 59 per day: 99.9% general aviation and 0.1% military. At that time there were 55 aircraft based at this airport: 91% single-engine, 7% multi-engine and 2% ultralight.  Skyhaven is known in the area for its relatively heavy skydiving operations.

References

External links 
 Skyhaven Airport (76N) information from Pennsylvania DOT Bureau of Aviation
 Aerial image as of 6 April 1992 from USGS The National Map

Airports in Pennsylvania
Transportation buildings and structures in Wyoming County, Pennsylvania